Classical Indonesian cinema is a term used in film criticism to describe both a narrative and visual style of Indonesian filmmaking which first developed in the 1926 to 1965.

History

1926–1945: Colonial era and emergence of the classical style 

The first film produced in colonial era was a silent fiction Loetoeng Kasaroeng (1926), who was based from Lutung Kasarung, a community legend from Parahyangan. It was sometimes credited as the first film of Indonesian cinema, and the first colonial film to feature a native-Indonesian cast from priyayi noble, who was the relative of Wiranatakusumah V. The film was screened in December 1926, and marks Bandung as the birthplace of Indonesian film.

In 1927, The second film produced in colonial era,Eulis Atjih, was released. It was the first film where Indonesian language was used for the first time, and mark the directorial debut of G. Krugers. It was screened at Orient Theater in Surabaya, East Java, and also mark the beginning of Indonesian film.

Major figures from classic Indonesian cinema 

 G. Krugers (1890–1964)
 Astaman (1900–1980)
 Tan Tjeng Bok (1900–1985)
 Fred Young (1900–1977)
 Bissu Usman (1901–1974)
 Andjar Asmara (1902–1961)
 The Teng Chun (1902–1977)
 Bachtiar Effendi (1903–1976)
 Rd Ismail (1904–1969)
 Albert Balink (1906–1976)
 Tan Tjoei Hock (1908–1984)
 Raden Ajeng Srimulat (1908–1968)
 Dr Huyung (1909–1952)
 Ratna Asmara (1913–1968)
 Annie Landouw (1913–1982)
 Rempo Urip (1914–2001)
 Fifi Young (1915–1975)
 Djoewariah (1915–1996)
 Chatir Harro (1915–1971)
 Djoemala (1915–1992)
 Djamaluddin Malik (1917–1970)
 Wolly Sutinah (1917–1987)
 Mien Sondakh (1917–present)
 Roekiah (1917–1945)
 Rd Mochtar (1918–present)
 Mohamad Mochtar (1918–1981)
 D. Djajakusuma (1918–1987)
 S. Waldy (1919–1968)
 Saeroen (1920–1962)
 Rendra Karno (1920–1985)
 Hadidjah (1920–2013)
 Darussalam (1920–1993)
 Max Tera (1920–1992)
 Usmar Ismail (1921–1971)
 Wahid Chan (1921–1971)
 Boes Boestami (1922–1970)
 Bachtiar Siagian (1923–2002)
 Risa Umami (1923–present)
 Amran S. Mouna (1923–1996)
 Elly Yunara (1923–1992)
 Sofia W. D. (1924–1986)
 A. Hamid Arief (1924–1992)
 Dhalia (1925–1991)
 Roldiah Matulessy (1925–present)
 A. N. Alcaff (1925–1987)
 Nurnaningsih (1925–2004)
 Roostijati (1925–1975)
 Marlia Hardi (1926–1984)
 Gretiani Hamzah (1926–present)
 Salmah (1926–present)
 Asrul Sani (1926–2004)
 Sri Aniah Uniati (1926–present)
 Hadisjam Tahax (1927–1987)
 Bing Slamet (1927–1974)
 Ratna Ruthinah (1928–present)
 W. D. Mochtar (1928–1997)
 Mimi Mariani (1928–1971)
 Ermina Zaenah (1928–present)
 Netty Herawaty (1929–1989)
 Nur Hasanah (1929–present)
 S. Bono (1930–1993)
 Lilik Sudjio (1930–2014)
 Tina Melinda (1931–present)
 Bambang Hermanto (1931–1991)
 Muni Cader (1932–2001)
 Komalasari (1932–2012)
 Kusno Sudjarwadi (1932–2008)
 Nana Mayo (1932–2008)
 Ellya Rosa (1932–present)
 Wim Umboh (1933–1996)
 Sjumandjaja (1933–1985)
 Nun Zairina (1933–2017)
 Chitra Dewi (1934–2008)
 Misbach Yusa Biran (1933–2012)
 Mardiana (1935–present)
 Titien Sumarni (1935–1966)
 Tuty S (1936–1993)
 Soendjoto Adibroto (1936–2001)
 Roosilawaty (1936–2009)
 Dian Anggrianie (1937–present)
 Teguh Karya (1937–2001)
 Titiek Puspa (1937–present)
 Aminah Cendrakasih (1938–2022)
 Rachmat Kartolo (1938–2001)
 Farouk Afero (1938–2003)
 Farida Arriany (1938–1977)
 Rima Melati (1939–2022)
 Baby Huwae (1939–1989)
 Mieke Wijaya (1940–2022)
 Lies Noor (1943–1961)
 Nani Widjaja (1944–2023)

List of selected notable films 
The following is a list of notable Indonesian films that were made during classical age.

Colonial era 

 Loetoeng Kasaroeng (1926)
 Eulis Atjih (1927)
 Lily van Java (1928)
 Njai Dasima (1929)
 Nancy Bikin Pembalesan (1930)
 Melati van Agam (1931)
 Njai Dasima (1932)
 Pareh (1935)

References 

1920s in film
1930s in film
1940s in film
1950s in film
1960s in film